Jozef Medgyes (born 31 July 1985) is a Slovak football defender  of Hungarian ethnicity who currently plays for Družstevník Topoľníky.

External links
FK DAC 1904 Dunajská Streda profile

References

1985 births
Living people
Slovak footballers
Association football defenders
FC DAC 1904 Dunajská Streda players
FC Spartak Trnava players
MŠK Púchov players
FC Senec players
ŠK Senec players
Slovak Super Liga players